Elvis Duran and the Morning Show (formerly known as The Z Morning Zoo) is an American syndicated weekday morning radio program hosted by Elvis Duran. The show originates from the studios of Newark-licensed WHTZ in New York City, a Top 40 outlet branded as "Z100". The show is also syndicated through Premiere Radio Networks in over 80 markets such as Philadelphia, Miami, Cleveland, and Richmond, Virginia. The live show is available in Canada on Fibe TV via Toronto's Proud FM. The live airing of the show is weekdays from 6 to 10 a.m. Eastern time, with most Central markets airing it live from 5 to 9 a.m., and other time zones further west taking the show on delay. Some stations, including WAZR, KCRZ, and WXXX, air a 5am "pre-show" (two pre-recorded segments and a phone tap) before the actual show. A "best of the week" compilation show is also carried on Saturday mornings by some stations.

Overview and Casting

1996–1999 
The popular "morning zoo" format began in 1981 at WRBQ-FM of Tampa, after which it was brought to WHTZ in 1983 by concept co-originator Scott Shannon. The format was widely employed, even being implemented at WHTZ's sister station in Cleveland, rock-formatted WMMS. The morning zoo formula at WHTZ lasted until 1994.

The show began on the legendary Z100 New York in 1996. Much of the original show members like Elvis Duran, Danielle Monaro, Skeery Jones and Scotty B are still cast members to this day.

Although the show was originally called Elvis and Elliot in the Morning, Elliot Segal left the show in August 1999, to host Elliot in the Morning on WWDC (FM).

2000–2010 

The show began to be syndicated to WHCY-FM in 2003. 

Christine Nagy left the show in January 2005, now at WLTW.

Also, in 2005 Carolina Bermudez and Froggy joined the show. 

The show began national syndication on May 22, 2006, starting with WHYI-FM Fort Lauderdale/Miami, then WIOQ Philadelphia on July 22, 2008, and WAKS Cleveland on August 25, 2008, with approximately 75 stations now carrying the show after Clear Channel's Premiere Radio Networks began to offer the program nationally in March 2009.

Until May 2008 the show was known as "Elvis Duran and The (Y/Z) Morning Zoo". With the addition of more stations, the word "Zoo" was replaced with "Show" to be more generic and to not conflict with other morning shows in other potential affiliate cities that might have a "Zoo" show.

John Bell left the show on March 22, 2010.

2010–Present 
Carolina Bermudez left the show in 2012 to join sister station WKTU.

Bethany Watson would later be announced as the newest cohost. She would later announce on February 13, 2018, that she would be leaving the show to pursue a career in acting, producing, and writing. She continues to host the 'An Acquired Taste Podcast' with another former morning show employee, Kathleen Heaney.

TJ Taormina left on February 21, 2013 to host the morning show at WODS Boston, with Loren Raye joining him a month later. When WODS changed formats, TJ had to continue the show as a podcast, and Loren replaced Kelly Doherty as the female imaging announcer.

Carla Marie and "Worst Assistant" Anthony announced on January 19, 2016, that they would be leaving the show on February 5, 2016, and starting their own morning show on Seattle's Power 93.3FM.

Greg T announced on September 26, 2019, that he would be leaving the show to join Carolina Bermudez on WKTU as Co-Host of the new Carolina with Greg T in the Morning Show. His last day was on October 7, 2019.

Additionally, in October 2020, the show gained its first International affiliate, CIRR-FM in Toronto, Ontario, which carries a format oriented towards the LGBTQ community.

David Brody left the show to pursue other creative opportunities and spend more time with his family on August 8, 2022, and had his farewell show on August 19, 2022.

Show Cast

Timeline of cast members

Syndicated stations

NY metro area
Z100 NYC – home radio station
96.1 KISS-FM – Poughkeepsie, NY
KC 101 – New Haven/Hamden, CT

New England
95 Triple X – Burlington/Colchester, VT
105.5 JYY – Concord/Hooksett, NH
Mix 102.5 – New Hartford, NY
Z107 – Portsmouth, NH
KISS 106.7 – Rochester, NY
KISS 102.3 – Albany/Latham, NY
HOT 107-9 – Syracuse, NY
NOW 105.7 Binghamton/Vestal, NY
Z97.1 – Rutland, VT
Y101 FM – Cape Cod, MA

Eastern seaboard
Q102 – Philadelphia/Bala Cynwyd, PA
Star 104 – Erie, PA
Hot 101.9 – Charlottesville, VA
93.7 Now – Harrisonburg, VA
FM 97 – Lancaster, PA
Q94 – Richmond, VA
JJS 93.5/102.7 – Roanoke, VA
Kiss 95.9 – Salisbury, MD
V97 – Williamsport, PA
Power 97.3 – Albany, GA
Q107.3 – Columbus, GA

Florida
Y100.1 – Fort Myers, FL
97.9 KISS FM – Jacksonville, FL
KISS 95.1 – Melbourne, FL
Y100 – Miami/Miramar, FL
Q92.9 – Ocala, FL
107.1 KISS FM – Tallahassee, FL

Texas
103-1 KISS FM – Bryan, TX
Hot 106.1 – Laredo, TX
97.5 FM – Waco, TX

Western United States
Power 94 – Bend, OR
96.7 KISS FM – Bozeman, MT
B97.3 – Clarkston, WA (begins show at 3:40 AM PDT, recaps first half at 7:20 AM PDT, ends approx. 12:30 PM PDT. Frequently airs replays)
Star 107.7 – Farmington, NM
99.9 XTC – Gallup, NM
HiTZ 104.9 – Visalia, CA

Midwest
Hot 95.7 – Cedar Rapids, IA
101.3 KISS FM – Davenport, IA
Channel 99.9 – Dayton, OH
107.5 KISS FM – Des Moines, IA
96.5 KISS FM – Cleveland, OH
93.9 KissFM – Lima, OH
Z104 – Madison, WI
Z96.3 – Manhattan, KS
Star 106.9 – Marion, IN
96.1 Kiss FM – Omaha, NE
98.5 KISS FM – Peoria, IL
Real 92.9 – Quincy, IL
107.1 KISS FM – Sioux City, IA
Mix 96.1 – Tomah, WI
Channel 96.3 – Wichita, KS
Hot 105.7 – Clarksburg, WV
102 The River – Vienna, WV
KISS 95.7 – Wheeling, WV

Southern United States
Hot Mix 101.9 – Fayetteville, AR
Hot 94.9 – Little Rock, AR
106.5 KISS FM – Madison, AL
101.9 KISS FM – Memphis, TN
92.1 The Beat – Tulsa, OK
94.1 ZBQ – Tuscaloosa, AL

International
Proud FM – Toronto, Canada

References

External links
 

American music radio programs
IHeartRadio digital channels